The 2023 Parapan American Games, officially the VII Pan American Games and commonly known as the Santiago 2023 ParaPan-Am Games, is an international multi-sport event for athletes with disabilities. It celebrates the tradition of the Parapan American Games as governed by the Americas Paralympic Committee and is scheduled to be held from November 17 to 26 in Santiago, Chile.

Development and preparation

Budget
The budget for the games is $507 million USD, with $170 million reserved for the building of ten new sporting venues and the upgrade of six arenas. The budget is about 36% of what was spent for the 2015 Pan American Games in Toronto, Canada and 50% of the last Pan American Games in 2019, in Lima, Peru.

Venues

Various venues across Santiago will host the games.

In June 2022, organizers revealed the final venue plan consisting of 41 competition venues. 14 of the 41 will be used for the Games. The venues span four regions of the country: Santiago, Valparaíso, O'Higgins and Biobío, however all Parapan venues are located in the Santiago area.

Athletes Village
In December 2021, a ceremony was held to lay the first brick for the village. The village is expected to cost approximately $100 million USD, and will consist of 1,345 apartments. After the games, the village will be converted to social housing. The village is being built in the Cerrillos Bicentennial Park community of Santiago.

The Games

Participating National Paralympic Committees
There will be 33 nations participating.

Sports
Events in 17 sports will be held during the 2023 Parapan American Games. Archery returns to the sports program for the first time since 2015, while sitting volleyball has been dropped from the games.

 Archery (9)
 Athletics (124)
 Badminton (16)
 Blind football (1)
 Boccia (11)
 CP Football (1)
 Cycling
  Road (17)
  Track (10)
 Goalball (2)
 Judo (8)
 Powerlifting (17)
 Shooting (10)
 Swimming (14)
 Table tennis
 Taekwondo (10)
 Wheelchair basketball (2)
 Wheelchair rugby (1)
 Wheelchair tennis (6)

Marketing

Emblem
2023 is the icon of the Games. It represents the target and goal of athletes and the organization, but also the beginning the legacy that will be built.

The creative inspiration comes from sports: geometry, angles, links and also the movement and dynamism that are and have always been present in sports particular form of expression. The morphology originates from sports venues and the connections between them, generating active life circuits that merge with the city. These forms build a distinctive and particular language, that represents both the spirit and essence of sports, as well as its integration with an active urban lifestyle.  

The color palette is inspired in the current city of Santiago and its future projection: a vibrant, modern, entertaining and multicultural city, that connects with its inhabitants and attracts its visitors.

The official emblem was unveiled on July 17, 2019, at the Centro de Alto Rendimiento CAR. The emblem was designed by Consultora b2o.

Mascot
For the election of the official mascot of the games, a vote will be held on the Internet from August 5 to 25, 2021 among the 5 options presented: «Fiu», a seven-colored bird; «Pewü», a pine nut of araucaria; «Chitama», a runner lizard from Atacama; «Juanchi», a penguin; and «Santi», a winged puma.

Slogan
The slogan was unveiled the same day as the emblem. The slogan of the games is "Follow Your Passion" (Spanish: "Sigue tu pasión").

See also
2023 Pan American Games

References

External links
Santiago 2023 Official Site

 
Parapan American Games
Parapan Games
International sports competitions hosted by Chile
Parapan American Games
Parapan American Games